Ana Konjuh and Carol Zhao were the defending champions, but both players chose not to compete in 2014.

Anhelina Kalinina and Elizaveta Kulichkova won the tournament, defeating Katie Boulter and Ivana Jorović in the final, 6–4, 6–2.

Seeds

Draw

Finals

Top half

Bottom half

External links 
 Draw

Girls' Doubles
Australian Open, 2014 Girls' Doubles